The Olsen Gang Sees Red is a 1976 Danish comedy film directed by Erik Balling and starring Ove Sprogøe, Morten Grunwald and Poul Bundgaard. The film was the eighth in the Olsen Gang-series, and was selected as the Danish entry for the Best Foreign Language Film at the 49th Academy Awards, but was not accepted as a nominee.

Plot
Egon is released once again from the prison in Vridsløselille, where he is received by Kjeld and Benny, after which they drive home to Kjeld and Yvonne. However, Yvonne is not very fond of Egon as he is constantly being arrested. Also present is Fie, who is to marry Børge, who always smashes the porcelain of the house. The gang starts discussing their upcoming coup, which is about a Chinese vase worth DKK 1.5 million, which is to be sold to a Dutch buyer. The gang breaks in and steals the vase at Sankt Annæ Plads in Copenhagen but finds out that it is a Chinese copy from Hong Kong and that Egon has been cheated.

The gang then set off to steal the original vase, but Egon gets trapped and walled inside a basement, so Benny and Kjeld must free him. The vase is in turn handed over to the Dutch buyer. The band therefore continues the hunt for the Royal Theater, where the buyer is with the money and the vase. The gang breaks through four walls with various tools to reach an elevator and on to the Dutch buyer, where they steal the money and the vase. Fie and Børge get married and fly to Mallorca, but it turns out that Fie has changed the suitcase with the one with the money. The two newlyweds fly off with the money, while the gang at home are shocked to see that the suitcase is full of clothes and not the money they expected.

Cast
 Ove Sprogøe as Egon Olsen
 Morten Grunwald as Benny Frandsen
 Poul Bundgaard as Kjeld Jensen
 Kirsten Walther as Yvonne Jensen
 Jes Holtsø as Børge Jensen
 Lene Brøndum as Fie Jensen
 Bjørn Watt-Boolsen as Lensbaron Ulrik Christian Frederik Løvenwold
 Ove Verner Hansen as Frits
 Ejner Federspiel as Joachim
 Axel Strøbye as Crime Assistant Jensen
 Ole Ernst as Police Assistant Holm
 Buster Larsen as Master Chef
 Bent Mejding as Conductor

Reception
The film received critical and audience praise, for its writing, acting, directing and music, and was selected as the Danish entry for the Best Foreign Language Film at the 49th Academy Awards, but was not accepted as a nominee. The film also became a box office success, selling about 1.3 million tickets, making it the highest-grossing Danish film of all time.

See also
 List of submissions to the 49th Academy Awards for Best Foreign Language Film
 List of Danish submissions for the Academy Award for Best Foreign Language Film

References

External links
 
 

1976 films
1976 comedy films
1970s heist films
Danish comedy films
1970s Danish-language films
Films directed by Erik Balling
Films with screenplays by Erik Balling
Olsen-banden films